{{DISPLAYTITLE:C11H17NO2S}}
The molecular formula C11H17NO2S (molar mass : 227.32 g/mol) may refer to :
 2C-T, a psychedelic drug
 Thiomescaline
 TIM (psychedelics)